Henry Beins House (also known as the Frederick William and Anna Beins House) is a historic house located at 620 Locust Street in Washington, Franklin County, Missouri.

Description and history 
It was built about 1868, and is a -story, three bay, hall-and-parlor plan brick dwelling on a brick foundation. It has a side-gable roof and segmental arched door and window openings. It has an open frame porch which has simple Victorian style ornamentation.

It was listed on the National Register of Historic Places on September 14, 2000.

References

Houses on the National Register of Historic Places in Missouri
Houses completed in 1868
Buildings and structures in Franklin County, Missouri
National Register of Historic Places in Franklin County, Missouri